The Halberstadt G.I was a German prototype heavy bomber built by Halberstädter Flugzeugwerke during World War I.

Design
It was a two-seat biplane equipped with two  Mercedes D.III engines. The aircraft's armament consisted of one or two Parabellum MG14  machine guns mounted in the rear cockpit on a flexible mount.

Development
The Halberstadt G.I first flew in spring 1916, but test results showed no real improvement over existed G-series aircraft, and the Luftstreitkrafte rejected the design for consideration into production.

Specifications (G.I)

See also

References

External links
 

1910s German bomber aircraft
G.I
Aircraft first flown in 1916